The International Graduates Scheme (IGS) was a UK immigration scheme which was launched on 2 May 2007 and ended on 30 June 2008, when it was replaced by Tier 1 (Post Study Work).  It allowed non-EEA nationals who successfully complete a relevant UK degree or postgraduate qualification to work or set up a business in the UK for 12 months without needing a Work Permit.  The principle of the scheme, and of its successor, is to retain skilled and educated graduates as part of the UK labour force, who will switch into a longer-term work schemes.

History

The Science and Engineering Graduates Scheme (SEGS) launched in October 2004, allowing graduates with a UK degree in certain subject areas to work in the UK after graduation for twelve months.  

On 1 May 2006, SEGS was expanded to include all postgraduate courses in any subject area that started after that date.  

IGS replaced SEGS from 1 May 2007.  However, applicants who had successfully completed their course before 1 May 2007 could still qualify under the old SEGS rules if they had successfully completed the relevant course in the last 12 months.

IGS and the similar Fresh Talent - Working in Scotland Scheme were discontinued on 30 June 2008, and replaced with Tier 1 (Post-Study Work) which was itself discontinued in March 2012.

References

See also
 Immigration to the United Kingdom
 Points-based immigration system (United Kingdom)

Immigration to the United Kingdom